Father and Son is a 1994 drama film written and directed by Pasquale Pozzessere. It won two David di Donatello Awards, for best cinematography and best editing.

Cast 

Michele Placido: Corrado
Stefano Dionisi: Gabriele
Enrica Origo: Angela
Carlotta Jazzetti: Anna
Giusy Consoli: Valeria
Claudia Gerini: Chiara
Luciano Federico: Aldo

References

External links

1994 films
Italian drama films
1994 drama films
1990s Italian films